A total solar eclipse occurred on May 6, 1883. A solar eclipse occurs when the Moon passes between Earth and the Sun, thereby totally or partly obscuring the image of the Sun for a viewer on Earth. A total solar eclipse occurs when the Moon's apparent diameter is larger than the Sun's, blocking all direct sunlight, turning day into darkness. Totality occurs in a narrow path across Earth's surface, with the partial solar eclipse visible over a surrounding region thousands of kilometres wide. The path of totality fell across the southern Pacific Ocean with no major landfall. Partiality was visible from far eastern Australia at sunrise, and New Zealand, as well as western South America and southern Mexico near sunset. This eclipse is a member of Solar Saros 136, and its maximum duration was 5 minutes and 58.24 seconds.

Observations 
A French expedition also observed the eclipse from Caroline, and the United States Navy mapped the atoll. Johann Palisa, a member of the expedition, discovered an asteroid later that year which he named Carolina "in remembrance of his visit to [the] island".

Related eclipses

Saros 136

Notes

References 
 NASA graphic
 Googlemap
 NASA Besselian elements
 The Total Solar Eclipse of 16th April, 1893. Report on Results Obtained with the Slit Spectroscopes, by E. H. Hills, 1894, The Royal Society.
 Scientific American: The Solar Eclipse Of May 6, 1883, Professor C. S. Hastings, of the Johns Hopkins University, also includes many interesting details in his account of the trip
 The total solar eclipse of May 6, 1883, Monthly Notices of the Royal Astronomical Society, Vol. 44, p. 180 
 Some of the Meteorological Results of the Total Solar Eclipse of May 6, 1883, Nature 31, 601–601 (30 April 1885) 

1883 06 06
1883 in science
1883 06 06
May 1883 events